Pandit Ganesh Prasad Mishra is an Hindustani classical music singer, He is also the son and Disciple of Mahadev Prasad Mishra. He Belongs from Varanasi in India. He is known for his Thumri style of Singing.

References 

20th-century Indian male classical singers
People from Varanasi
Year of birth missing (living people)
Living people
21st-century Indian male classical singers